The George Willard House, also known as New Freedom Spring, is a Federal style house with Greek Revival details near Jefferson, Maryland.  Built about 1818 for farmer and tanner George Willard, the house was altered by Willard's son after 1845 with Greek Revival remodeling.

The George Willard House was listed on the National Register of Historic Places in 1993.

References

External links
, including photo in 2004, at Maryland Historical Trust

Houses on the National Register of Historic Places in Maryland
Federal architecture in Maryland
Houses completed in 1818
Houses in Frederick County, Maryland
National Register of Historic Places in Frederick County, Maryland